Bliesdorf is a municipality in the district Märkisch-Oderland, in Brandenburg, Germany.

Demography

The conspicuous increases in 1996/97 and 2015 are due to the refugee camp in the village.

References

External links

Localities in Märkisch-Oderland